David Cunningham is an American football coach and former player.  He is the tailbacks coach at Minnesota State University, Mankato, where he has been an assistant coach since 2014. 

Cunningham served as the head football coach at Sue Bennett College in London, Kentucky from 1996 to 1997 and McPherson College in McPherson, Kansas from 2002 to 2006.

Playing career
Cunningham played college football at Kentucky Wesleyan from 1983 to 1987. After college, Cunningham played in the European Football League (EFL) with the Heathrow Jets in 1988, Terassa Sticks in 1991 and the Herlev Rebels in 1993.

Coaching career
From 1993 to 1995, Cunningham was an assistant coach at Kentucky Wesleyan. In 1996, Cunningham was hired as the head football coah at Sue Bennett College and served through the 1997 season. From 1998 to 1999, Cunningham returned to Kentucky Wesleyan as defensive coordinator. Starting in 2000 through the 2001 college season, Cunningham served as offensive coordinator at McPherson College in McPherson, Kansas. Also in 2001, Cunningham worked as defensive backs coach for the Houston Thunderbears in the Arena Football League (AFL).  

In 2002, Cunningham was named the head football coach at McPherson College and served in that role for five seasons from 2002 to 2006. He compiled a record of 24–26. From 2007 to 2009, Cunningham was the special teams coordinator at Nicholls State. In 2010, he moved to Mississippi Valley State and during his tenure served as a wide receivers coach and also a special teams coordinator until 2013.

In 2014, Cunningham moved to Minnesota State and was quarterbacks coach. In 2015, he became running backs coach at Minnesota State.

Head coaching record

References

External links
 Minnesota State profile

Year of birth missing (living people)
Living people
Kentucky Wesleyan Panthers football players
Kentucky Wesleyan Panthers football coaches
Houston Thunderbears coaches
McPherson Bulldogs football coaches
Minnesota State Mavericks football coaches
Mississippi Valley State Delta Devils football coaches
Nicholls Colonels football coaches
Sue Bennett Dragons football coaches